The following radio stations broadcast on AM frequency 1640 kHz: 1640 AM is a Regional broadcast frequency.

Argentina
 Hosanna in Isidro Casanova

México
 XECSIB-AM in Zamora, Michoacán

United States
All stations operate with 10 kW during the daytime and are Class B stations.

External links
 Radio Locator list of stations on 1640
 FCC list of radio stations on 1640 kHz

References

Lists of radio stations by frequency